In Old Kentucky may refer to:

 In Old Kentucky (1909 film), an American silent short drama film
 In Old Kentucky (1919 film), an American silent drama film
 In Old Kentucky (1927 film), an American silent drama film
 In Old Kentucky (1935 film), an American comedy film
 In Old Kentucky (stage play), see Louise Closser Hale